Daniel Diemer (born 21 June 1996) is a Canadian actor, best known for his role as Paul Munsky in Netflix's film The Half of It, directed by Alice Wu. Prior to starring in the movie, he played smaller roles in The Man in the High Castle and Sacred Lies.

Early life 
Daniel Diemer was born in Brentwood Bay, British Columbia. His father, Greg Diemer, works as a tennis coach and businessman. He has a younger brother, Aaron Diemer. During his youth, he worked eight different part time jobs, from coaching ping pong, picking blueberries, to low-level accounting work. When he was 12, he wrote and published a children's book.

At the age of 5, he started playing soccer and dreamed of becoming an athlete, going as far as playing internationally at the age of 12. He stopped playing because he "grew up like crazy and lost the speed." Not wanting to give up on sports, he turned to tennis. He played at the provincial level and wanted to seek university scholarship, before he suffered a back injury that forced him to opt out of an athletic career completely. With his 4.0 GPA, he then entered pre-med class at Camosun College. However, he dropped out after a semester to pursue creative work, starting with modeling for an art class. He graduated from the Victoria Academy of Dramatic Arts in 2016.

Before making his on-screen debut, Diemer lived alone in a makeshift building for construction workers. He would sleep on the couch and watch some TV in his spare time, and go to acting masterclasses.

Career

Early career (2014–2018) 
After a friend advised him, Diemer debuted on-screen in a Sidney York music video in 2014. After that, he enrolled in the Victoria Academy of Dramatic Arts, studying in the Acting for Film and Theater program. He auditioned many times but didn't receive any role offers for the first two years. He landed a role in the 2016 movie Bloody Blacksmith, and went on to star in four short-movies between 2017 and 2018.

Breakthrough (2018–2019) 
In 2018, Diemer played a recurring role in TV series Sacred Lies for four seasons. After that, he starred in two movies, Emma Fielding: More Bitter Than Death and Family Pictures. His role in Sacred Lies gained him popularity and helped him land a role in Amazon Prime's hit historical drama The Man in the High Castle.

The Half of It (2020) 
Diemer landed a lead role in Alice Wu's coming-of-age The Half of It, which Netflix distributed and premiered on 1 May 2020. He played as Paul Munsky, a clumsy football player who asks for help from a smart Asian introvert to woo a girl they both want by writing her letters. Alice Wu held at least 600 casting auditions before discovering Diemer. On why she chose Diemer, Wu said, "Daniel exudes authenticity. He's handsome – but not in a way that screams 'Hollywood pretty boy.' I needed that rare quality of his for this film to land; with Daniel, the audience can go on the ride and feel like they are watching real people, not actors, living their lives in small town rural America. He feels like 'one of us' even though, in reality, he is 6'4" and beautiful." Diemer said his athlete background helped him in the movie.

The movie received favorable reviews, and won Best Narrative Feature at the 2020 Tribeca Film Festival.

Personal life 
Diemer is dating Brazilian-born actress Larissa Dias.

Filmography

Film

Television

References

External links 
 
 

1996 births
21st-century Canadian male actors
Living people
Male actors from British Columbia
Camosun College alumni